Branko Krsmanović (1915–1941) was a participant in the Spanish Civil War and the National Liberation struggle and national hero of Yugoslavia.

References

External links
Mutnica.net - Branko Krsmanović 

1915 births
1941 deaths
Yugoslav people of the Spanish Civil War
International Brigades personnel
Yugoslav Partisans members
Recipients of the Order of the People's Hero